Miguel Angel Suárez Fernández (born 5 July 1902 in Placetas, Cuba) was a Cuban lawyer and politician.  He served as the Cuban Foreign Minister in 1951.

Biography
Suárez was the son of Miguel Ángel Suárez Gutiérrez, who a Cuban Senator from the Las Villas Province and had served as Secretary of Commerce during the presidency of Carlos Mendieta. He graduated from the Colegio de Belén in 1920 and later from the University of Havana School of Law.

He was the Registrar of Properties for the city of Guanabacoa and later went on to serve in the Cuban House of Representatives and the Cuban Senate for Las Villas province. He served as the President of the Cuban Senate from 1945 to 1950. He was a signatory of Cuba's 1940 Constitution.

After Fidel Castro overthrew the government in 1959, Suárez went into exile: First to Venezuela, then to Puerto Rico and finally to Miami.

References

 New York Times; Cuban Third Front Selects Candidate; 20 March 1948 Page 7.
New York Times; Cuba Chided of Defence: Senator Accuses Batista of Secrecy of Policy; 15 June 1941 Page 17.
 The Miami Daily News; Vote in Cuba Dashes Batista Comeback Hope; 2 June 1950 Page 1.
 Sarasota Herald-Tribune; Cuba Exile Heads Hit British Deal; 9 January 1964 Page 3.
Grandes Debates de la Constituyente Cubana de 1940 by Néstor Carbonell Cortina; Ediciones Universal, 2001; .
  (Spanish)
 https://web.archive.org/web/20100527085433/http://www.lajiribilla.cubaweb.cu/2007/n346_12/346_01.html

1902 births
1968 deaths
People from Placetas
Cuban people of Spanish descent
Government ministers of Cuba
Presidents of the Senate of Cuba
Members of the Cuban House of Representatives
20th-century Cuban lawyers